Gedawari may refer to:

Godawari, Kailali, a municipality in Kailali, Nepal.
Godawari, Lalitpur, a municipality in Lalitpur, Nepal
Godawari Khola, a river in Nepal

See also
Godavari (disambiguation)
Godwari dialect, spoken in Rajasthan, India